Drexel 4257, also known by an inscription on its first page, "John Gamble, his booke, amen 1659" is a music manuscript commonplace book. It is the largest collection of English songs from the first half to the middle of the 17th century, and is an important source for studying vocal music in its transition from  Renaissance music to Baroque music in England. Many songs also provide commentary on contemporary political events leading up to the Restoration.

Belonging to the New York Public Library, it forms part of the Music Division's Drexel Collection, located at the New York Public Library for the Performing Arts. Following traditional library practice, its name is derived from its call number.

Historical context 
Before researchers took active interest in it, the field of 17th-century British song had not been investigated. Music historian Charles Burney had a negative opinion towards British vocal music in this period. That attitude was carried through the beginning of the 20th century, where in the first edition of the Oxford History of Music, Hubert Parry stated that English composers' sense of musical line was deficient.

Vincent Duckles thought one reason for the negative attitude might have been the lack of published sources: Between 1627 (the publication date of John Hilton's Ayres or Fa-las) and 1651 (John Playford's Musical Banquet), there appeared only a single publication of British vocal music:  Walter Porter's Madrigales and Ayres of 1632.

Scholarly work on Drexel 4257 was one of the major reasons for a change in attitude. With over 320 songs, 250 of which contain music, it is "the largest single body of early 17th-century English songs that we know."  "The composers ... all belonged to the small world of court musicians that suffered disruption during the English Civil War and the Commonwealth of England. Some began their careers late in the reign of James I, most saw service in court of Charles I, and a few survived to return to their posts at the invitation of Charles II."  For the most part, their active careers were over by 1660 or shortly thereafter.

The compiler (or compilers) was not an antiquarian: this collection of songs was intended for practical use, and represents the generation of English composers active between 1630 and 1660. As such, Drexel 4257 "stands as the record of English musical and literary taste as it developed over a period of some thirty years," moving from the late Jacobean era to Restoration periods. Though its musical contents may sometimes be variable, its main interest is that, as a document of its time, it reflects contemporary taste, offering comments on contemporary events and references to the past.

By virtue of its repertoire and of the period covered, Drexel 4257 is closely related to other 17th-century English music manuscripts:  2240 (British Library Deposit), Drexel 4041 (New York Public Library), Don.c.57 (Bodleian Library), Add. 29,396 (British Library), Add. 11,608 (British Library), MS B.1 (Bodleian Library), Add. 31432 (British Library), Add. 10337 (British Library), F.5.13 (Trinity College, Dublin), Egerton 2013 (British Library), Drexel 4175 (New York Public Library), Add 29381 (British Library), MS 1041 (Lambeth Palace Library), and MS 87 (Christ Church Library).

General and physical description 

The binding of Drexel 4257 measures .  It contains 227 leaves which measure  (the leaves' varying length can add or subtract  several millimeters to their respective measurement).  
As the image at left indicates, the volume was rebound on December 6, 1944 by Neumann Leathers of Hoboken, New Jersey.  The folios are not numbered, but each song is numbered. Using different methods of enumeration, scholars have disagreed on how many songs are contained in the manuscript. Hughes wrote that the collection contained 246 songs, 146 of which are by unidentified composers, but he was only counting songs with "a musical setting sufficiently complete to make identification possible." Duckles claimed there were 325 different songs numbered 1 through 329:  two songs occur twice ("Keepe on yor vayle and hide yor Eye" nos. 134 and 237, and "If thou wilt loue me I'le loue thee" nos. 174 and 215). Additionally, nos. 275 ("Stay, stay, prate noe more") and 324 ("I haue reason to Fly thee") are satirical replies to anti-Royalist lyrics not included in the manuscript.  No. 206 is blank and not identified in the index, and the song "Why sligh'stt thou her whome I aproue" is both nos. 222 and 223. There are also two songs listed in the index for which no space was allotted. For Duckles, eighty-five of the 325 songs are lacking music and have either just titles, or titles and lyrics only. Elise Bickford Jorgens counted 327 songs, including songs listed in at least one of the two tables of contents but for which there is no music. (This article and the table below uses Jorgens' enumeration.)

The breakdown of the 97 songs by known composers is as follows:  John  Gamble (28), Henry Lawes (28), William Lawes (10), John Wilson (11), William Webb (8), Thomas Brewer (3), Robert Smith (2), Nicholas Lanier (2), Walter Youckney (2), Robert Johnson (1), John Withy (1), and Charles Coleman (1).

Folio 1 verso contains a bawdy lyric followed by the inscription written twice, "John Gamble his booke amen 1-6-5-9 an[n]o Domini." The material on Folio 2 recto is from a later date. The upper half of the page contains an engraved portrait of Gamble, printed by W. Richardson in 1795, pasted in. The lower portion contains a brief biographical inscription concerning Gamble in the hand of the former owner, Edward F. Rimbault. A note giving a brief description of the contents has been tipped in near the center of the binding.

There are two tables of contents. The first, with the heading "The Cattalogue" on folios 3r-5r, is a numbered list of songs from 1 through 266. Starting with song no. 201, the style of enumeration varies inconsistently: no. 201 is listed as 2001, 220 is listed as 20020. Additionally, there is a group of songs incorrectly altered to 300s. The second table, on folios 5v-8r, has no heading but is an alphabetical grouping of songs where in each letter the songs are listed sequentially. This list was apparently compiled after the manuscript was completed and includes all songs except nos. 314-317. It is written by the same hand as the enumerator of songs 177-266 in "The Cattalogue."

The manuscript as currently bound (the date accompanying the binding information on the inside rear cover is stamped Dec. 6, 1944) has some songs out of sequence (nos. 331-340), surrounded by no. 311 and 312.

Dating 

The date of 1659 (from Gamble's inscription on 1v) has been a source of puzzlement to those who have studied the manuscript. Willa McClung Evans, consulting Edward Heawood's study of watermarks (used to date paper), noted the watermark, a fleur-de-lis, was of undetermined origin, but was also used in Fuller's "Holy State" of 1652, and Denis Petau "History of the World" of 1659. Charles W. Hughes believed the book was begun around the turn of the 17th century - a hypothesis rejected by Jorgens who notes that it contains works by Henry Lawes, born in 1596. Hughes believed the terminal date was at least 1660, as  some of the songs refer to Charles II of England, who assumed the throne in the Stuart Restoration of 1660. Duckles noted that the earliest lyrics were from England's Helicon (1600) and Davison's Poetical Rhapsody (1602). Duckles felt that 1659 is close to the terminal date, noting that no songs had been added after the English Commonwealth period, and no younger composers were included in the  collection.

Provenance 

Though writers disagree on details of the handwriting (see the section on handwriting below), they all agree that the handwriting of the latter portion of Drexel 4257 is probably that of John Gamble, given that there is a concentration of his work in that part of the manuscript. This suggests that the book was begun by someone else (whom Lynn Hulse recognized as Thomas Jordan; see below). Duckles surmised that Gamble came into possession of the book in 1642–43 when the musicians of the Royal Chapel were dispersed as a result of the English Civil War. Although Gamble lost most of his possessions in a fire in 1666, this book appears to have survived. He made out his will on 30 June 1680, in which he bequeathed his grandson (also named John Gamble) all his books of music.

After Gamble's death in 1687, nothing is known of the manuscript for over 150 years. The first published reference to it comes in 1846, where it is mentioned in volume 19 of the Percy Society's Early English Poetry, Ballads, and Popular Literature of the Middle Ages as being in the possession of one of the editors of the series, Edward Francis Rimbault. An organist and musicologist, Rimbault took a keen interest in English music and voraciously collected rare books, scores, and valuable manuscripts. Upon his death, his extensive and valuable library was auctioned by Sotheby's over the course of five days. The Rimbault auction catalog entry for the Gamble manuscript reads:

A  collection  of upwards  of 300 songs by Wilson, Lawes, Johnson, Gamble, and other English composers, containing also the autograph inscription,  "John  Gamble his  book,  Amen. 1659  Anno  Domini"

Hughes quotes a contemporaneous report of the hammer price and comment:  "Thirteen  guineas, for  America." The reference was to the Philadelphia-born financier Joseph W. Drexel who had already amassed a large music library and purchased about 300 lots from the Rimbault auction. Upon Drexel's death, he bequeathed his music library to The Lenox Library. When the Lenox Library merged with the Astor Library to become the New York Public Library, the Drexel Collection became the basis for one of its founding units, the Music Division. Today, Drexel 4257 is part of the Drexel Collection in the Music Division, now located at the New York Public Library for the Performing Arts at Lincoln Center.

Organization 
Duckles noted that there are subsidiary groups organized by composer:  Henry Lawes (nos. 26-36), William Webb (nos. 160-166), Robert Smith (nos. 237-238),Thomas Brewer (nos. 244-245), Robert Johnson (nos. 108-109), and John Gamble (nos. 292-319). Similarly is the group of three songs set by John Wilson for Richard Brome's play "The Northern Lass" (nos. 45, 46, and 47).

The first 47 songs are love lyrics by poets of the Jacobean Court, including Ben Jonson, William Shakespeare, Robert Herrick, Thomas Carew, John Suckling, Beaumont and Fletcher. After no. 47 a new spirit is suggested by song no. 48 "You madcapps of England that merry will make," a lusty drinking song that indicates a political shift after 1640. Deliberate segregation is in evidence between songs nos. 48 and 80, where there are a series of 32 ballads and popular songs, in contrast to the art lyrics of the first few songs. There is a brief return to the elevated nature in songs nos. 154-76. Thereafter, popular and sophisticated songs are mixed.

Handwriting 

Hughes and Duckles both believed that the manuscript was written by at least two individuals. Hughes characterized the first hand as a "neater, older hand" dating from either at the end of the 16th century or beginning of the 17th century (a date disputed by subsequent writers - see above). The second hand copied the newer songs (including some by Gamble) and were written in a more careless hand.   Hughes believed that this evidence suggested that the manuscript was begun by an unidentified person and was continued by John Gamble himself commencing with song no. 177.

Following Hughes's view, Duckles also believed the manuscript was written in two hands. In his view, the first hand wrote the titles for songs nos. 1-176 of the Catalogue, and the second hand, probably that of Gamble himself, wrote of nos. 177-266 (leaving space left to accommodate future additions) as well as the alphabetical index. Duckles described the writing style of Hand 1 as favoring  "round, compact letter forms, vertical alignment, calligraphic flourishes on capitals and heavy down strokes," when writing with a broad pen. Duckles admits that Hand 1 has "two forms": "When the hand writes with a finer quill, the letter forms are more loosely connected, the flourishes a little more pronounced, and there is a slight inclination to the right."  Hand no. 2 has a "pronounced slant to the right, letter forms are thin and elongated and the pen is a fine one." Duckles observed that hand no. 2 participated slightly in the preparation of part 1 (nos. 1-176) with only six songs, but all of the text incipits. Likes Hughes, Duckles also felt that Hand 2 is probably that of Gamble.

Duckles hypothesized that the first hand might have been that of Ambrose Beeland, with whom Gamble apprenticed and is believed to have been his teacher. Lynn Hulse refutes this, saying that the handwriting does not match existing Beeland manuscripts.

Jorgens disagreed with both Hughes and Duckles and saw three different hands.  Based on the two tables of contents, Jorgens surmised that all three copyists had access to the book at one time.  She characterized the first hand as "firm, bold but well-controlled secretary hand," the second hand as "looser and somewhat lighter secretary hand" beginning with song no. 38, and a third hand, "rougher, slanted, inclined towards the Italian style" that begins with song no. 46. All three roughly equal; by no. 177 the first two have dropped out. Hand Three has entered all of Gamble's songs and is probably his. It also has entered text incipits. Since these incipits do not correspond with other known songs, they are probably the work of Gamble.

Hulse identified the first hand of the Gamble manuscript is probably that of poet Thomas Jordan (ca. 1612–1685), the same hand as manuscript PwV18 in the University of Nottingham, as well as other Jordan manuscripts in Harvard University and Bodleian Library. Hulse showed that Jordan and Gamble were involved in the same London circle of theatre musicians and composers for many years, culminating in Jordan's preface for Gamble's A Defence for Musick published in 1659. She identifies songs nos. 4, 16, 32, 45, 47, 99, 154, 155, 169, 170, 175, 176 and the text incipit of 96 as being copied by Jordan.

Politics 
The lyrics to a number of songs have references to contemporary politics and events. "Since Itt hath bin lately inacted high Treason" (no. 313) carries a strong suggestion of reaction to contemporary British history. One song, "Beat on, proud billows," was known to have been written by Roger L'Estrange while he was imprisoned in Newgate Prison during Oliver Cromwell's rule (1645–1648).

Some songs express regret for a better past. "Listen iolly gentlemen Listen & be merry" (no. 63) praises the reign of Charles I (indirectly criticizing the then-current regime). The lyric of "Reioyce all England" contrasts the 13th-century hero Guy of Warwick with current rulers.  One song alludes to the marital difficulties between Charles II and his Portuguese wife, Catherine of Braganza. Another example of distrust of foreigners can be seen in the lyric "Harke harke Ile tell you news from the Cort ... all ye french ... now are all sent back to France." Charles II also figures in "God bless our noble king," which comically describes the king's progress from Whitehall to St Paul's Cathedral.

"You madcaps of England" describes frivolous English soldiers at the siege of La Rochelle, including characters named "Wentworth" (referring to Thomas Wentworth, 1st Earl of Strafford) and "Murrey" (referring to Robert Moray). Other names mentioned include: Wilmot, Weston, George Symon, Steadlinge, Hugh Pollerd, and "Game" possibly John Gamble.

Some songs reveal prejudice against Puritans. No. 92, ""Cock Lorrell inuited ye diuell his gestt," concerns Cock Lavorel, known as a rogue and highway robber, as friends with the devil. "The purelings of the Citty" (no. 70) is an exception, praising a Protestant service.

Duckles took note of the bold lyrics to song no. 73:

Ye giddy poets that purloin from sea and land the greatest store to deck her ffading wenches fine, what would you do with such a whore? 

Duckles clarified the meaning: "The outspoken vulgarity was not necessarily result of personal taste but a reflection of Royalist protest against Puritan morality, intended to shock the taste of Parliamentarians."

Topical or literary content 
Hughes argued that, unlike a textbook compilation of exemplars, Drexel 4257 shows a variety of good and mediocre poetry. Most songs deal with love, and range from flowery rhetoric to frank accounts of love-making.  A few, however, deal with topical matters. There are two songs related to Christmas: "Beate upp a dromm" depicts feasters in a mock battle with the cold in which the feasters win, and "Christmas is my name ffar have I gone" was a popular ballad which appeared in a number of 17th-century sources. In this song, the personification of Christmas comes from far away to discover that his friends and other residents have deserted the country in favor of the city. The song concludes with a lament that universal welcome is gone because the Protestants and Puritans disassociate themselves from Christmas. Similarly (with fewer political overtones), the song "Ladies you loose yor time" expresses preference for city life over that of the country.

The song "Oh yt mine eyes", a graphic meditation on the Crucifixion of Jesus, is the only song in the collection to deal with a religious subject.

The song "Nor loue nor fate dare I" by John Wilson bears the inscription "composed for the comedy The Northern Lass". Although this is the only song that the manuscript indicates is from a drama, at least 26 songs have texts from dramas or masques, attesting to Gamble's association with the theatre.

The songs composed by Gamble are best characterized as drolls. Drolls were collections of "cavalier wit, much of it trivial, repetitious and derivative, but at the same time containing some work of genuine literary value. Their tone was seldom dignified, often frankly sexual, and characterized by a persistent undertone of anti-Puritan feeling."  Similar examples can be found in the work of Ben Jonson, Thomas Carew and John Suckling.

Musical content and style 
Hughes cursorily observed that Drexel 4257 contains no naturals—sharps are used to cancel flats, and flats are used to cancel sharps.  He noted that technical blunders such as parallel fifths and octaves are to be found as well as other kinds of mistakes.

Duckles's dissertation explores the transition from the lute song, representing an older style of composition appropriate to the waning of Renaissance music, to the continuo song, reflecting newer Baroque music practice. It's not always an easy form of composition to assess: lutes were not always used for songs, and sometimes were used even after ascendancy of the continuo song. General characteristics of the lute song are smooth, flowing, and restrained lines, while the continuo song is more vigorous, abrupt and discontinuous. The harmonies in lute songs are an outgrowth of their melodic lines, while in continuo songs they define the structure. Lute songs tend to be loose and melismatic with frequent repetitions of verse fragments, while continuo songs are more closely tied to the rhythm of the text. Dissonance and chromaticism are used sparingly in lute songs while continuo songs show increasing use of chromaticism for more dramatic rather than pictorial underscoring. Generally, English composers were more concerned with capturing verbal rhythms than producing dramatic effects.(Hughes noted that Restoration lyrics typified Baroque figures of speech in their use of florid lyrics.)    Use of these techniques in England indicate their adoption from Italy, where they were first used. Previously, it had been thought that English composers either didn't know about them, or weren't interested.  But a comparison of Drexel 4257 with another of Gamble's books in the British Library, Additional 11608, where some of the songs appear in an embellished form, indicate that British composers and singers did occasionally  adopt a more florid style.

Duckles examined the song "If Loue loues truth then woemen doe not loue" by Thomas Campion which appears as no. 10 of Drexel 4257 and was also published in Campion's Third Book of Ayres from about 1617. Campion was generally a conservative composer.  In the version present in Drexel 4257, the melody is slightly altered to provide greater sensitivity to the declamatory text, so that the speed of the verse accelerates naturally, an alteration which Duckles finds an improvement over the original.  Many songs are recitative-like. In some of these songs, the bar is enlarged as it approaches the cadence, suggesting a ballad singer who briefly pauses to catch his breath. The hemiola a consistent practice in English music of this time.

Many songs are 6/4 meter, while some suggest that they are adaptations from violin tunes.  Yet, the barline does not always reflect the verbal rhythm. In comparing the song "Ballowe my babe lye still and sleepe", no. 46 of Drexel 4257, with the version that appears in Elizabeth Rogers' Virginal Book, Duckles notes that the (earlier) virginal version is in duple meter with no trace of hemiolas, while the version in the Gamble manuscript has them, suggesting a modernization of an older song.  Another example of continuo style is "Like Hermitt poore in pensiue place obscure" (no. 15), a lyric attributed to Sir Walter Raleigh and dating from 1591.  In comparing Alfonso Ferrabosco's setting from his Ayres of 1609 to one by Nicolas Lanier in Drexel 4257, Duckles admits the possibility that Lanier's may have been inspired by that of Ferrabosco. But the musical characteristics of the Lanier setting, including simplicity of texture, distinct phrases, use of an échappée, and the suggestion of  a rhythmic motif through use of a recurring pattern of eighth notes, point to contemporary text setting techniques.  The song "Drowsie sun, why dostt thou stay" by Thomas Brewer (no. 253) shows expressive false relations and harmonic word painting, foreshadowing later developments in British sacred music. Brewer's songs are among the earliest examples of the Italian pathetic style in English music and represent the mature style of continuo song. Devices such as an octave leap look away from lute song to continuo song.

Not all songs with recitative-like musical lines indicate modernism.There are dance songs that contain elements of an ostinato bass, passamezzo antico and the romanesca—all characteristics of Renaissance rather than Baroque periods.  Several tunes and texts are of 16th-century origin had long been in the repertoire, among them: "Greensleeves," "O mistress mine," and "Back and sides go bare." With  these exceptions, the earliest songs date from Jacobean period. A comparison with anthologies published by John Playford in 1652, 1653 and 1659 indicates particular songs were popular. That selections were copied into the book attests to their popularity even after tastes had changed due to the Restoration.  Similarly, the song "I went from England into ffrance," a satirical narrative, refers to the song "John Dory," indicating that song's continued popularity. (It had appeared in Thomas Ravenscroft's "Deuteromelia" of 1609, though probably dates earlier). "When ye Chill Charockoe blowes" is a song containing both declamatory and tuneful styles.  It is a drinking song, whose erratic harmony suggests frequent cadences, and whose angular melody which "moves with great vigor,"  This is in contradistinction to the lute song that emphasized continuous flow and smooth melodic motion.

Duckles identifies two styles of songs of the collection:  "The declamatory air" (reflecting modern style), and "the tuneful air" (reflecting the older style, a vestige of Renaissance musical practice).  The tuneful air could be composed based on a  preexisting tune or a tune intended to be a dance form. In examining lyric forms, Duckles identified the ballad as one type of lute song. The ballads found in Drexel 4257 are all of a sophisticated type in which satire and parody are important elements. The ballad as simple narrative or topical ballad are not represented.

Warning that one must be wary of the fluid nature of musical genres, Duckles categorized the following songs from Drexel 4257 as ballads: 46, 48, 49, 51, 53, 55, 56, 58, 59, 60, 62, 63, 64, 66, 67, 68, 70, 74, 76, 79, 92, 103, 104, 105, 116, 119, 120, 121, 123, 131, 142, 144, 145, 146, 147, 186, 214, 271, 272.

Duckles identified these songs as being in the declamatory style: 4, 12, 15, 20, 22, 26, 30, 31, 33, 83, 89, 108, 132, 160, 161, 162, 164, 168, 172, 182, 188, 198, 206, 238, 239, 240, 243, 247, 249, 253, 256, 260, 261, 262, 269, 274, 277, 280, 284, 285, 292, 299, 306, 311, 315, 316, 317, 323, 326.

Duckles observes that by 1651, the transition from the lute song to the continuo song was complete. Printed versions of songs can not be entirely trusted to represent what was sung, since, in order to keep engraving costs manageable, they would economize on written vocal embellishments. That's why manuscript sources are crucial to our understanding of transition to Baroque vocal styles. Duckles concludes by warning that those who study early 17th century lyric poetry must do so in conjunction with their intended musical settings, since words and music are inseparable.

Significance  
In his dissertation, Duckles summed up Gamble and his manuscript:

List of songs 
This table is based on the table of contents listed in Jorgens, supplemented with composer, lyricist attributions and other remarks from Duckles 1953.

Facsimile 
A facsimile of the manuscript was published as Drexel Ms. 4257: John Gamble, "His booke, amen 1659", in English Song, 1600–1675: Facsimiles of Twenty-Six Manuscripts and an Edition of the Texts, vol. 10, by Garland Publishing of New York in 1987, with an introduction by Elise Bickford Jorgens.

See also 
 Drexel 4041
 Drexel Collection

Notes

Bibliography

External links 
Drexel 4257 digitized
NYPL catalog record
RISM OPAC: thematic index of Drexel 4257

1660 books
17th-century manuscripts
Baroque music manuscript sources
Books on English music
English manuscripts
Manuscripts in the New York Public Library
Music anthologies
The Restoration
Works by William Shakespeare
Cultural depictions of Charles II of England
Cultural depictions of Catherine of Braganza